1985 World Masters Athletics Championships is the sixth in a series of World Masters Athletics Outdoor Championships (called World Veterans Games or World Masters Games at the time) that took place in Rome, Italy, from June 22 to 30, 1985.

The main venue was Stadio Olimpico located within the Foro Italico sports complex.

Stadio Olimpico had hosted the 1960 Summer Olympics. Supplemental venues included Stadio dei Marmi, also located within the complex,

Stadio Acqua Acetosa and Stadio della Farnesina.

This edition of masters athletics Championships had a minimum age limit of 35 years for women and 40 years for men.

The governing body of this series is World Association of Veteran Athletes (WAVA). WAVA was formed during meeting at the inaugural edition of this series at Toronto in 1975, then officially founded during the second edition in 1977, then renamed as World Masters Athletics (WMA) at the Brisbane Championships in 2001.

This Championships was organized by WAVA in coordination with a Local Organising Committee (LOC) headed by Cesare Beccalli,

who later was elected WAVA president on December 2, 1987 in Melbourne.

In addition to a full range of track and field events,

non-stadia events included 8K Cross Country, 10K Race Walk (women), 20K Race Walk (men), and Marathon.
The relays were resurrected as official events after being removed in the 1983 Championships,

but teams were formed by region rather than by nation.

Relays will revert to national teams for 1987.

Controversy
In 1976, the International Amateur Athletic Federation (IAAF) had expelled the Amateur Athletic Union of South Africa due to the apartheid policy of the South African government at that time,

though the WAVA constitution as written in 1977 specifically stated its independence from IAAF regarding this issue:

Nevertheless, participation of South African athletes had been an issue in this series. At this Championships, about 48 South Africans competed, though they signed up through another nation,

in a manner similar to the last 2 Championships in 1981

and 1983,

However, many of these athletes were listed under their native  flag in the results.

Results
Past Championships results are archived at WMA.

Additional archives are available from Museum of Masters Track & Field

as a pdf book,

as a searchable pdf,

and in pdf newsletters from National Masters News.

The pdf book includes a rare photograph of the blind sprinter Fritz Assmy next to his son/guide.

The August newsletter shows a series of photographs of Assmy in action, guided by his son with a short wrist tether. Assmy won golds in M70 100m and 200m, and silver in 400m.

He described his running technique in the June newsletter.

Several masters world records were set at this Championships. World records for 1985 are from the Museum of Masters Track & Field searchable pdf unless otherwise noted.

Women

Men

References

World Masters Athletics Championships
World Masters Athletics Championships
International athletics competitions hosted by Italy
1985
Masters athletics (track and field) records